The Former Command House is a historic building, located at Kheam Hock Road in Singapore. It was the residence of the General Officer Commanding (GOC) of Malaya during British colonial period.

History

Prior to World War II
The Former Command House is built  and was known as Flagstaff House. Its predecessor, the former Flagstaff House, built in 1925 was located at Mount Rosie.
It was to have been one of three residences to have been built for the senior commanders of the three service arms: the army, led by the General Officer Commanding (GOC), Malaya (Army); the Air Force, led by the Air-Officer Commanding (AOC), Far East in Tanglin (there is no evidence of this having been built) and the Navy (Admiralty House at Old Nelson Road).

It was announced in March 1937 a new Flagstaff House would be built to house the GOC of Malaya, costing 100,000 Straits dollars at a site near Bukit Timah Road.

The first occupant was Lieutenant-General Sir William Dobbie who shifted to the new premise in October 1938.
Subsequent occupants were Lieutenant-General Sir Lionel Bond in 1939 and Lieutenant-General Arthur Percival in 1941. Briefly after Percival's appointment, Air Vice-Marshall Conway Pulford of the Royal Air Force's Officer Commanding moved into Flagstaff House.

World War II
During the war, the surrounding area of the Flagstaff House was known as Sime Road Camp, which is the Combined Operations Headquarters for the British Army and Air Force. During the fall of Singapore, Sime Road Camp was forsaken and shifted to the underground bunker at Fort Canning. During the Japanese occupation of Singapore, Flagstaff House was the Japanese soldiers’ quarters and Sime Road Camp was an internment camp for POWs.

In 1946, the Flagstaff House was Admiral Lord Louis Mountbatten's residence during the British Military Administration.

Post Independence
After the British military completed their withdrawal, Flagstaff House became the residence of Singapore's Speaker of Parliament, Dr Yeoh Ghim Seng. His successor, Tan Soo Khoon did not stayed at the Flagstaff House.

The Flagstaff House was rented to a building management company and later rename as the Command House.

Between 1996 and 1998, when the Istana underwent a major renovation, the Command House was the temporary residence of then president of Singapore Ong Teng Cheong. Ong, who was an architect, played an important role in restoring the Command House and add a reception hall.

On 11 November 2009, the building was gazetted as a national monument of Singapore and its name was changed to Former Command House upon gazette.

It is currently occupied by a Business University.

Architecture
The two-storey colonial residence was designed in a unique Arts and Crafts architectural style popular in the 19th century.

Flagstaff House was probably designed by architect Frank Brewer, who had designed the former Cathay Building.

References

Buildings and structures completed in 1938
Landmarks in Singapore
National monuments of Singapore
20th-century architecture in Singapore